William "Smokes" Aloisio (October 9, 1906 – October 3, 1979) was an American mobster and "hitman" for the Chicago Outfit. 

A former member of the Forty-Two Gang in Chicago, Aloisio's arrest record dated back to 1928. In 1945, Aloisio was sentenced to five years at Leavenworth Penitentiary, in Leavenworth, Kansas, for helping his brother avoid military conscription, during World War II. Aloiso had bribed U.S. Navy personnel in Chicago to make sure that his relative failed his physical examination.

Further reading
United States. Congress. Senate. Government Operations Committee. Organized Crime and Illicit Traffic in Narcotics. 1964.
United States. Congress. House. Government Operations. Federal Effort Against Organized Crime. 1970.

External links
U.S. vs. Cerone

 

1906 births
1979 deaths
American gangsters of Italian descent
Chicago Outfit mobsters
Mafia hitmen